This is a list of Quebec Major Junior Hockey League seasons since inception of the league.

See also
Quebec Major Junior Hockey League
List of OHL seasons
List of WHL seasons

Quebec
   
Ice hockey